Paul Richard Flatley (born January 30, 1941 in Richmond, Indiana) is a former American football wide receiver who played for the Northwestern Wildcats from 1960 to 1962 and later in the National Football League from 1963 to 1970.

In 1962, Flatley was a vital part of Northwestern's offensive attack which helped earn the Wildcats the #1 AP ranking for two weeks mid-season. Flatley led the team in receiving yardage and participated in the 1962 East-West Shrine Game.

During his professional career, he played for the Minnesota Vikings (1963–1967) and the Atlanta Falcons (1968–1970). Drafted by the Vikings in the 4th round in the 1963 NFL Draft, Flatley was selected as the UPI NFL-NFC Rookie of the Year. As a Viking, Flatley played in the 1966 Pro Bowl.

He is a member of the Indiana Football Hall of Fame. He was a member of the Minnesota Golden Gopher football radio broadcast team, along with Ray Christensen for many years.

References 

1941 births
Living people
Sportspeople from Richmond, Indiana
Players of American football from Indiana
American football wide receivers
Northwestern Wildcats football players
Minnesota Vikings players
Western Conference Pro Bowl players
Atlanta Falcons players
Minnesota Golden Gophers football